Chlou is a village in Ochamchira District, Abkhazia, Georgia.

Demographics
At the time of the 2011 census, Chlou had a population of 1,609. Of these, 95.4% were Abkhaz, 3.3% Georgian, 0.7% Russian, 0.1% Ukrainian and 0.1% Armenian.

See also
 Ochamchira District

References

External links
Official website

Populated places in Ochamchira District